Yo Gabba Gabba! is a children's musical television series created by Christian Jacobs and Scott Schultz. The series is about five costumed toys come-to-life and their friend DJ Lance Rock (Lance Robertson). It is co-produced by Magic Store Productions and WildBrain. Its first episode premiered on Nickelodeon on August 20, 2007, as a part of its Nick Jr. block. Its original run ended on November 12, 2015.

A single topic is addressed in each episode (such as "Adventure", "Friends", or "Dance") through songs and short storylines. Additionally, the show teaches children life and social skills, such as sharing and trying different foods. It also encourages viewers to move along with and dance with the characters in the program. The show is noted for its indie-culture guest stars and bands, and for drawing visual inspiration from 8-bit video games and H.R. Pufnstuf, among other television shows. Created by Christian Jacobs (lead singer of the Aquabats) and Scott Schultz, the show's learning process has parents, older siblings, and younger children watch the show together rather than letting it act as a babysitter. The television program spawned a touring live stage show, several toys, and branded clothing.

On September 10, 2021, WildBrain announced that the series would be revived for 20 new episodes, which will be produced in collaboration between WildBrain and Yo Gabba Gabba LLC (the co-owners of the Yo Gabba Gabba! brand). The new episodes will premiere on Apple TV+, which also acquired the previous episodes and specials for its service.

Overview
Hosted by a musician named DJ Lance Rock, the series features live-action segments featuring 5 costumed toys: Muno (a red cyclops), Foofa (a pink flower bubble), Brobee (a green broccoli bee/monster), Toodee (a blue cat-dragon), and Plex (a yellow robot). In between the main segments are many short animated sketches and songs.

Among the varied animation sequences during the show was "Super Martian Robot Girl", designed by indie cartoonists Evan Dorkin and Sarah Dyer. The title character of the segment was voiced by Ariela Barer in season one and Caroline Jacobs in season three.

Kidrobot made the toy models of the characters that appear at the beginning and end of each episode. The title of the show pays homage to "Gabba Gabba Hey" by the punk rock band Ramones.

History
Yo Gabba Gabba! was developed by two Southern California fathers and punk rockers, Christian Jacobs and Scott Schultz, who first started working together as teenagers, producing and directing skateboarding videos. Their goal was to design a kids' show that was entertaining while featuring real artists and real performers. Both had no past experience writing scripts for television, let alone children's broadcasting or education. In developing the show they took inspiration from a number of classic children's series including Sesame Street, The Electric Company, Pee-wee's Playhouse, Zoom, as well as Sid and Marty Krofft puppet shows The Banana Splits and H. R. Pufnstuf.

In 1999, after becoming parents, Jacobs and Schultz started playing around with ideas for children's television and produced a pilot independently financed by small loans from friends and family. Yo Gabba Gabba! did not get much attention until it started circulating on the Internet. Jared Hess, the director of Napoleon Dynamite and Nacho Libre, saw the pilot online and recommended it to Brown Johnson, the executive vice president and executive creative director of Nickelodeon Preschool.

Episode format

All episodes follow a similar format. In the opening scene of the episode, DJ Lance is shown walking on a plain white background while holding a silver radio with colorful buttons. He then arrives at a table with four different colored lands and a silver design underneath it. He then places down the boombox, and then he shouts "YOOOO Gabba Gabba!" and opens the boombox, and inside it are five toys: Muno, Foofa, Brobee, Toodee, and Plex. He places down the toys one-by-one, and then they become alive.

The episode features four main segments (shortened to three after the first season) that are connected to each other as a plot. They involve DJ Lance and the Gabba gang doing an activity. After each main segment, a short clip is shown that shows a child dancing around. The child says his or her name, followed by "I like to dance!".

Between the main segments, there is another segment called "The Super Music Friends Show", which features a performance by an artist or a band about the episode's theme. Other small segments include "Mark's Magic Pictures" and "Biz's Beat of the Day".

Near the end of each episode, DJ Lance and the Gabba gang do a mix-like song about what had occurred during the main segments. After it is finished, DJ Lance thanks to the children at home for playing along and shouts "YOOOO Gabba Gabba!" once again. Then Muno, Foofa, Brobee, Toodee, and Plex turn back into toys. One-by-one, DJ Lance puts them back in the boombox, closes it, and then walks off carrying it, thus ending each episode.

Cast and characters
 DJ Lance Rock – Lance Robertson (voice dubbed by Ortis Deley in the UK version): a human DJ who is the friend of the Gabba gang and the show's host. He likes to fly.
 Muno – voiced by Adam Deibert (Bob Golding in the UK version): a friendly red cyclops who is the main character. He is the tallest, is somewhat clumsy and has a close friend with Foofa. Muno is also the band's guitarist. He lives in a rock-filled summer-themed place called "Muno Land". His hobbies are playing his guitar, seeing bugs, skateboarding, and building blocks. His realm resembles the desert and he has a pet horse. During Super Bowl XLIV, he appeared in a 2010 commercial for the Kia Sorento.
 Foofa – voiced by Emma Jacobs (Teresa Gallagher in the UK version): a pink flower bubble character who is cute and happy. She likes flowers, rainbows, dolphins, and unicorns. She lives in a spring-themed place called "Foofa Land". She is the band's tambourinist. Her realm is a spring meadow. Her hobbies are watering flowers, whistling, playing her tambourine, and riding her bike.
 Plex – voiced by Christian Jacobs (Simon Feilder in the UK version): a yellow robot who is intelligent and the oldest of the Gabba gang. He is described as being smart and as the leader of Gabba Land. Plex often teaches lessons to his friends and is a father figure to the gang. He can also use his special ray to bring things into existence and transport living things. He is the band's keyboardist who plays the keytar. He has no realm in particular, though he seems to have a "docking station" between Foofa and Brobee's realms. His hobbies are driving his car, playing his keytar, and opening his compartment.
 Brobee – voiced by Amos Watene (Simon Feilder in the UK version): a short, green broccoli bee monster and the youngest of the Gabba gang. He lives in an autumn-themed place called "Brobee Land". He is the band's drummer. He is the one of the characters whose facial expression changes depending on the situation; his normal face turning into a frown, and vice versa. He is often subjected to trying different foods. His realm is a large autumn forest. 
 Toodee – voiced by Erin Pearce (Jonell Elliot in the UK version): a blue arctic cat-dragon who loves to have fun. She has a close friend with Plex and is also the band's bassist. She lives in an arctic winter-themed realm called "Toodee Land". Her hobbies are ice skating, playing her bass, surfboarding, and tap-dancing.
 Gooble (supporting character) – voiced by Joel Fox: a white ghost who is always very sad and lives in a place known as "Gooble Land".
 Super Martian Robot Girl – voiced by Ariela Barer in season one: a green and pink superhero who appears in her title segment from season one. She returned as a guest in season three and was voiced by Caroline Jacobs.
 Mark Mothersbaugh (supporting character): a member of Devo who draws pictures in his segment "Mark's Magic Pictures" that become alive. 
 Biz Markie, a rapper and DJ who makes beatboxing in his segment "Biz's Beat of the Day".

Guest stars 
Yo Gabba Gabba! featured hundreds of guest stars:

 Mos Def
 Bootsy Collins
 Ladytron 
 The Killers 
 Enon
 The Clientele
 Jimmy Eat World 
 Solange Knowles
 Taking Back Sunday 
 Datarock
 The Aquabats
 Devo
 Anne Heche
 Joy Zipper
 Of Montreal
 Chromeo
 My Chemical Romance
 Weezer
 Hot Hot Heat
 The Faint
 The Roots
 Paul Williams
 Mates of State
 MGMT
 Peter Bjorn and John
 Trunk Boiz 
 The Shins
 The Aggrolites
 The Flaming Lips
 Mýa 
 Blitzen Trapper
 The Ting Tings
 Money Mark
 Mariachi El Bronx
 "Weird Al" Yankovic
 Erykah Badu
 Sean Kingston

Other celebrities to have appeared include Jason Bateman, Jack Black, Andy Samberg, Melora Hardin, Tony Hawk, Elijah Wood, Sarah Silverman, Laila Ali, Bill Hader, and Anthony Bourdain.

Regular segments
 Jingles, each episode has animated music videos featuring music by a guest performer and animation by guest artists, designers, and animators. They often happen after the first segment in every episode.
 Mark's Magic Pictures, starring Mark Mothersbaugh, drawing simple pictures that often come alive at the end of the segment. 
 Biz's Beat of the Day, starring Biz Markie, demonstrating new beatboxing beats.
 The Super Music Friends Show, featuring musical guests and introduced by Matt Chapman as the announcer and John Reis as "The Music Swami". 
 Dancey Dance Time, featuring celebrity guests doing dance moves with the characters. It was rarely used after season 1.
 Numbers, live action music video similar to the jingles, usually with counting up numbers or back.
 Cool Tricks, in which child or an adult demonstrates a special talent.
 Storytime, where a child narrates a story.
 Super Martian Robot Girl, a comic book segment featuring a helpful green-haired superheroine who saves the day, but only solves extremely contrived misunderstandings of uninformed citizens, instead of fighting crime. This segment was used in season 1 and returned for one episode ("Superhero") in season 3.
 Learn with Plex, a solo segment in which Plex teaches kids basic daily skills like brushing their teeth, making lemonade, putting pajamas, etc. in children's shouts, using four repeated steps. Only used in season 1.
 Play Pretend with Muno, in which Muno encourages viewers to pretend along with him, as he imagines himself as different animals, even an astronaut and a Christmas tree. Only used in season 1.
 Listen with Toodee, in which Toodee listens to sounds and encourages the viewer to help her identify them. Only used in season 1.
 Color with Brobee, in which the viewer guesses what color Brobee is thinking of by the examples he gives. Only used in season 1.
 Play Games with Foofa, in which Foofa solves simple puzzles, such as mazes and matching games, and encourages the viewer to help her find the solution. Only used in season 1.
 DJ Lance Dance, in which DJ Lance teaches children doing a random dance.
 Funny Faces, in which DJ Lance Rock encourages children to make funny faces.
 Knock-Knock Joke of the Day, a segment where Jack McBrayer and Paul Scheer tell knock-knock jokes. This segment first appeared in season 2.
 Look Back at Today, each episode ends with a music video recap of that episode, featuring special effects, and a remix of every song featured in that episode.

Episodes

Home media

Main releases

Episodes on Nick Jr. compilation DVDs

Episodes on Nick Jr. iTunes compilations
NOTE: As of June 2019, the episodes are no longer part of the compilations due to the series being removed from Nick Jr.'s platforms.

Soundtrack releases
Four albums have been released featuring songs from the show performed by the cast and the "Super Music Friends Show" segment.
 Music is. Awesome! (2009)
 Music is. Awesome! Volume 2 (2010)
 Music is. Awesome! Volume 3 (2011)
 Music is. Awesome! Volume 4 (2012)
 Hey! (2017)
 Fantastic Voyages (2017)

ABC for Kids released a CD in 2014 titled Yo Gabba Gabba! Party In My Tummy.

Stage shows
The world premiere live concert tour of Yo Gabba Gabba! took place in Australia in May 2009. DJ Lance Rock, Muno, Foofa, Brobee, Toodee, and Plex performed in Wollongong, Melbourne, Brisbane, and Sydney with an indie house-band and secret special guests at each show. Additional tours in the United States and other countries have been performed throughout 2013. Shows have been toured including three presented by Kia Motors and a special Christmas one presented by Citi, Just Dance Kids, and Toys for Tots.

 "There's a Party in My City!" (2011)
 "It's Time to Dance!" (2011)
 "Get the Sillies Out!" (early 2013)
 "A Very Awesome Holiday Show!" (late 2013)
 "Music Is Awesome!" (2014)

Nick Jr. Australia released a tour in 2009 called Yo Gabba Gabba: LIVE on Stage!

Critical reception
On April 30, 2008, the television show received a Daytime Emmy nomination for Outstanding Achievement in Costume Design/Styling. The show has been nominated for a Daytime Emmy in both 2008 and 2009 for Best Costume Design. Time magazine's James Poniewozik, who said the show "will convince you someone slipped something into your Fruity Pebbles" named Yo Gabba Gabba! one of the Top 10 new TV series of 2007, ranking it at #8. In November 2008, the Yo Gabba Gabba! production team won a BAFTA Children's Award, International. The show has also become popular among some college-aged young adults because of the artists often featured. Due to the show's popularity amongst both adults and children, they performed at Coachella 2010 as special guests. Their live touring show also won a Creative Content Award at the 2010 Billboard Touring Awards. The Television Critics Association Awards have nominated Yo Gabba Gabba! for Outstanding Achievement in Children's/Youth Programing. The years include 2008–2012. Yo Gabba Gabba! won for the year 2009 and 2010. In February 2013, Yo Gabba Gabba! won two Kidscreen Awards for "Best Non-Animated or Mixed Series 2013" and "Best Music 2013".

In other media
 In 2009, the cast was featured in their own float in the Macy's Thanksgiving Day Parade. 
 Muno was featured in a commercial for the Kia Sorento that aired during the 2010 Super Bowl and other Kia commercials in 2011. Also, the character Brobee appeared in a 2011 advertisement for Wonderful Pistachios.
 The cast appeared in the Big Time Rush episode "Big Time Cameos".
 Yo Gabba Gabba! appeared in True Jackson VP in the episode "Trapped in Paris".
 Garry Lyon, of The Footy Show, an Australian Football League panel show, performed an interpretive cycle (Yo Gabba Gazza!) based on the Yo Gabba Gabba! dancing style after losing a humorous bet. The choice of the Yo Gabba Gabba! dance was based on a number of physical similarities to Brobee, including bushy eyebrows and excessive androgenic hair.
 In the Mad episode "So You Think You Can Train Your Dragon How to Dance / Yo Gagga Gagga!", Lady Gaga hosts Yo Gagga Gagga! featuring her dolls – Taylor Swift, T-Pain, Miley Cyrus, and Triple H – and the cast is seen watching a monster movie at the end.
 In 2011, the cast appeared in the Raising Hope episode "Sabrina Has Money".
 The title of the Futurama episode "Yo Leela Leela" parodies this, as does the show Leela produces during the episode, known as "Rumbledy Hump".
 On June 8, 2012, The Fresh Beat Bands 15th episode in season three "Yo! Fresh Beats Go Gabba Gabba!" (a crossover episode) the "Gabba Gang" gets beamed into the episode by way of a malfunctioned Plex has with robotic hiccups which was caused by Gearmo: a gear who always causes trouble.
 Insane Clown Posse recorded a cover of the song "Hold Still" for the 2012 album Smothered, Covered & Chunked.
 The South Park episode "Taming Strange" features Foofa becoming a spoof of Miley Cyrus after Kyle's adopted younger brother, Ike, attends a performance and "tames Foofa's strange" in front of everyone seeing the show.
 The cast appeared in a Delta Airlines safety video which first aired in August 2015.
 In 2017, A spin-off called DJ Lance and The Upbeat Retreat!, produced by WildBrain Studios (now WildBrain Spark Studios) premiered on YouTube, featuring DJ Lance Rock with his new friends.
 The cast appeared in Cupcake Wars.
 The cast appeared in Top Chef Masters
 The series is spoofed in the Robot Chicken episode "May Cause Light Cannibalism".
 The series is briefly featured in the Marvel Cinematic Universe miniseries WandaVision, appearing on Agnes' television screen in the seventh episode "Breaking the Fourth Wall".

References

External links
Official sites
 Official website
Channels
 Yo Gabba Gabba on Nick Jr. Italy
 Yo Gabba Gabba on Nick Jr. (UK)
 Yo Gabba Gabba on Nick Jr. (U.S.)
 Yo Gabba Gabba on ABC4Kids
 Yo Gabba Gabba on Roku
 Yo Gabba Gabba on YouTube
Others
 
 

2000s American animated television series
2010s American animated television series
2000s American children's comedy television series
2010s American children's comedy television series
2000s American musical comedy television series
2010s American musical comedy television series
2000s American sketch comedy television series
2010s American sketch comedy television series
2007 American television series debuts
2015 American television series endings
2000s Canadian animated television series
2010s Canadian animated television series
2000s Canadian children's television series
2010s Canadian children's television series
2000s Canadian music television series
2010s Canadian music television series
2000s Canadian sketch comedy television series
2010s Canadian sketch comedy television series
2007 Canadian television series debuts
2015 Canadian television series endings
2000s preschool education television series
2010s preschool education television series
Animated television series reboots
American children's animated comedy television series
American children's animated musical television series
American children's musical television series
American preschool education television series
American television shows featuring puppetry
American television series with live action and animation
Animated preschool education television series
Canadian children's animated comedy television series
Canadian children's comedy television series
Canadian children's animated musical television series
Canadian preschool education television series
Canadian television shows featuring puppetry
Canadian television series with live action and animation
Children's sketch comedy
Dance television shows
English-language television shows
Family Jr. original programming
Nick Jr. original programming
Nickelodeon original programming
Treehouse TV original programming
Television series by DHX Media
Television shows filmed in California